Marie Benedicte Bjørnland (born 30 April 1965) is a Norwegian lawyer. She is the current Director of Police since 2019, and was the head of the Norwegian Police Security Service (PST) from 2012 to 2019. 

She was born in Kristiansand and grew up in Lier and Sandefjord. After obtaining a Master of Law degree from the University of Oslo, she worked as a deputy judge in Skien and Porsgrunn and as a consultant in the Directorate for prices, with most of her career in various positions in the police force, becoming Chief of police in Vestfold in 2007. As part of the latter position, she led the local branch of PST.

Bjørnland was appointed chief of Police Security Service on 8 June 2012.

In 2016, Bjørnland stated in a radio interview with The Norwegian Broadcasting Corporation that being expressively 'anti-Islam' is enough to be considered as 'right-wing extremist' by PST.

On 20 December 2018, she was nominated to succeed Odd Reidar Humlegård as director of police. She assumed office on 1 April 2019.

As of 2022, she is involved in a case involving employment termination of a whistleblower at Police Security Service; in October that year, the agency of which she is chief - asked the justice ministry if Bjørnland has a conflict-of-interest in the case; according to a later media report, she has a personal conflict with whistleblower Øyvind Tenold. As of October 28, the justice ministry will not make a judgement call, in regard to the question about conflict-of-interest. Later in October, media uncovered that the Police Directorate had been involved when Tenold was fired as leader of "Police Security Service at Vest Politidistrikt". Tenold has filed a complaint about his termination; that complaint is in the hands of a committee at Police Directorate - "the central employment-council". However, media has pointed out that the case work to decide the complaint - will be done by the Police Directorate, which has already been involved in the case of which the complaint comprises.

Personal life: Bjørnland is married with two children and resides in Sandefjord.

References 

1965 births
Living people
Norwegian jurists
Directors of government agencies of Norway
University of Oslo alumni
People from Kristiansand
People from Sandefjord